Aldo César da Silva or simply Aldo (born January 9, 1977), is a Brazilian central defender. He currently plays for Santa Cruz on loan from Goias.

Honours
Brazilian League (3rd division): 2002
Goiás State League: 2006

Contract
Santa Cruz (Loan) 18 July 2007 to 3 January 2008
Goiás 4 January 2005 to 3 January 2008

External links 

 sambafoot
 CBF
 zerozero.pt
 Guardian Stats Centre
 coralnet

1977 births
Living people
Brazilian footballers
Brazilian expatriate footballers
Liga Portugal 2 players
Clube Atlético Mineiro players
Ituano FC players
Botafogo Futebol Clube (SP) players
Associação Portuguesa de Desportos players
Figueirense FC players
América Futebol Clube (MG) players
Brasiliense Futebol Clube players
C.D. Santa Clara players
Goiás Esporte Clube players
Santa Cruz Futebol Clube players
Expatriate footballers in Portugal
Association football defenders
Sportspeople from Minas Gerais